Edmond Virieux (24 December 1893 – 10 September 1969) was a Swiss architect. His work was part of the architecture event in the art competition at the 1924 Summer Olympics.

References

1893 births
1969 deaths
19th-century Swiss architects
20th-century Swiss architects
Olympic competitors in art competitions
Architects from Geneva